((Lit. tame :wikt:sow; generally known in English as "Tame Boar") was a night fighter interception tactic conceived by Viktor von Loßberg and introduced by the German Luftwaffe in 1943. Once in the stream, fighters made radar contact with bombers, and attacked them for as long as they had fuel and ammunition.

See also 
  (Wild Boar)
 List of World War II electronic warfare equipment: Tactics
 Night fighter

References

External links
 Luftwaffe  night fighter control methods

Luftwaffe